Gem Ramos is a Filipino actress, dancer and singer.

Personal life 
Ramos is the sister of former South Border vocalist Duncan Ramos.

Filmography

Television

Awards and nominations

References

External links

Filipino television actresses
Living people
1978 births